WFFN (95.3 FM, "95.3 The Bear") is a radio station licensed to serve Coaling, Alabama, United States, and broadcasting to the Tuscaloosa, Alabama, area. The station is owned by Townsquare Media. It broadcasts a country music format.  It became the hom, in 2021, of the top-rated "Steve & DC Show". As of 2023, WFFN-FM's Steve & DC is the No. 1 rated station in mornings, with the advertiser coveted young adult demographics, according to Nielsen Audio.

The station was assigned the WFFN call letters by the Federal Communications Commission on April 15, 1987. The station changed its city of license from Cordova, Alabama, to Coaling, Alabama, in late 2005.

In June 2004, New Century Radio (Vachel L. Posey Jr., president) reached an agreement to transfer WFFN to Apex Broadcasting Inc. (Houston L. Pearce, chairman) in consideration of the costs to build the facilities related to the then-upcoming change in the community of license. The deal was approved by the FCC on June 24, 2004, and the transaction was consummated on June 30, 2004. At the time of the sale, the station broadcast an oldies music format.

In February 2005, Apex Broadcasting Inc. (Houston L. Pearce, chairman) reached an agreement to sell WFFN and six other radio stations in Alabama to Citadel Broadcasting Company (Farid Suleman, chairman/CEO) for a reported sale price of $29 million. At the time of the sale, the station broadcast an oldies music format. Citadel merged with Cumulus Media on September 16, 2011.

Cumulus sold WFFN and its sister stations to Townsquare Media effective July 31, 2012.

References

External links
95.3 The Bear WFFN official website

FFN
Country radio stations in the United States
Tuscaloosa County, Alabama
Radio stations established in 1987
1987 establishments in Alabama
Townsquare Media radio stations